Organisation of Independent Youth Zarzewie was a clandestine Polish youth organization, formed in May 1909 in Lemberg, Austrian Galicia. Based on Association of the Polish Youth "Zet", its objective was the restoration of independent Poland. As part of Polish Military Union (Polski Zwiazek Wojskowy), Zarzewie trained recruits for the future Polish Army.

From March until May 1911, Zarzewie, with support of scouting instructor and physician Kazimierz Wyrzykowski, carried out first training course, with emphasis both on physical education and political training (with lectures by Eugeniusz Romer). Meanwhile, Zarzewie formed first cells in Russian-controlled Congress Poland and the Kingdom of Prussia. During World War I, most members of the organization joined Polish Legions in World War I.

Zarzewie was dissolved in February 1920.

See also 

 Secret society

Sources 
 Garlicka, Aleksandra (red.), Zarzewie 1909-1920 – Wspomnienia i materiały, Instytut Wydawniczy PAX, Warszawa, 1973

See also 
 Riflemen's Association

Polish independence organisations
Secret societies in Poland
1909 establishments in Poland
Youth organizations established in 1909